Humnasheen (or Hum Nasheen) is a 2013 Pakistani drama serial by Hum TV, which aired for the first time on 24 February 2013. Serial is directed by Siraj-ul-Haque and written by Syeda Shahla Shakoor. It is produced by Momina Duraid, stars are Adnan Siddiqui, Faiza Hasan, Arij Fatyma, Rija Ali, Humayun Ashraf and Raheel Butt.

Plot
The story revolves around the family of Hassan Munir. Munir and Asmat Aara have been married for 15 years and are childless. Asmat Aara desires children and gets her husband, married to the much younger Mehrunnisa, in hope that she would bear him the children she could not. Mehrunnisa has been engaged to Shehzad (Humayun Ashraf) and madly in love but her fiance is unemployed. Seeing that, Mehrunnisa's family forcefully wed her away with Hassan Munir. Mehrunnisa accepts this as fate and devotes herself to be a dutiful wife of Hassan and bears his twins. Asmat Ara initially gets jealous of Mehrunnisa, but later she chooses to mother the twins and trades off her companionship with Hassan, which Mehrunnisa fils perfectly. Mehrunnisa goes on to complete her studies and gives birth to another child, which she chooses to raise herself.

After a lapse of years, the children are grown up, and the twins Aaliya and Safeer are copies of Asmat Ara in personalities. Safeer is proud and bossy where as Aaliya is a classy girl. Safeer is in love with Alishba who is the daughter of Najm-Uz-Zaman - a cold enemy of Hassan. Najm-uz-Zaman has left no stone upturned to beat Hassan Munir in construction business. Asmat approves of the marriage, despite of Hassan's disapproval and after death of Hassan, she gets Aaliya married to Saqib and Safeer married to Alishba. Things take a worse route as Safeer, under his father-in-law's influence, sells of the construction business and starts off a new business which proves to be a huge loss. Alishba also treats her in-laws in a bad manner. Meanwhile, Aaliya has to get divorce from her husband as her husband turns out to be gay.

Mehrunnisa and Asmat Ara are left together to pick up the shattered pieces of their life together after Hassan Munir. Asmat apologizes for all the wrongdoings she did with Mehrunnisa over years. Shehzad enters back in their lives as an ex-accomplice of Hassan and an established businessman and helps Safeer in the loss and uncovering the real culprit of the failure, who turns out to be Najam-uz-Zaman. Alishba tries to turn Safeer against Shahzad by revealing that Shahzad is Mehrunnisa's ex fiance. But Asmat Ara takes stand with Mehrunnisa and clears her position among all. Mehrunnisa's brother is keen on getting her married to Shahzad, as Shahzad did not get married after the failed love affair with Mehrunnisa. Mehrunnisa strongly opposes and declares her eternal love for her dead husband and vows to live with the memories of Hassan till her last breath.

Cast
 Adnan Siddiqui as Hassan Munir. 
 Faiza Hasan as Asmat Aara, the first wife of Hassan Munir.
 Arij Fatyma as  Mehrunisa, the much younger, second wife of Hassan Munir.
 Raheel Butt as Safir, Hassan Munir's elder son.
 Alyzeh Gabol as Aliya, Hassan Munir's only daughter and the twin sister of Safeer.
 Mustafa Changazi as Uzair, Hassan Munir's youngest son.
 Sarah Khan as Sara, Mehrunisa's niece and Uzair's girlfriend, later becomes his wife.
 Jinaan Hussain as Alishba, Safir's wife.
 Tabbasum Arif as Khalda
 Muneeb Butt as Saqib, Ex-husband of Aliya
 Behroze Sabzwari
 Sabahat Ali Bukhari as Alishba's mother, Safir's mother-in-law.
 Humayun Ashraf as Shehzad 
 Qaiser Naqvi as Mehrunissa's mother
 Birjees Farooqui as Abida
 Rija Ali
 Amir Qureshi

International Broadcast
 The show was telecast in India on Zindagi from 13 April 2015 Mon - Sat 7:30 pm under the title Kabhi Aashna Kabhi Ajnabi.
 In UK, the show was premiered on 13 December 2019 on Hum Masala Europe and aired every Friday to Sunday nights at 10:00pm (GMT).

References

External links 
 
 

Hum TV original programming
2013 Pakistani television series debuts
Pakistani drama television series
Urdu-language television shows
Zee Zindagi original programming